Mark Dean may refer to:
Mark Dean (computer scientist) (born 1957), American inventor and computer engineer
Mark Dean (footballer) (born 1964), English soccer player
Mark Dean (swimmer) (born 1967), USA Olympic team member in 1988
Mark Dean (American football) (1917–2006), American football player and coach
Mark Dean (basketball) (born 1971), Bahamian basketball player
Mark Dean (politician) (born 1980), American politician from West Virginia

See also